John Maggio may refer to:
 John Maggio (pharmacologist), American pharmacologist
 John Maggio (director), American documentary film director, writer and producer